Citizenship in North Korea is a status given to individuals recognized as North Korean by the government of the country. It is a source of shared national identity, but can also be one of contention or conflict.

Nationality law of the DPRK

North Korea adopted a nationality law in 1963, 15 years after being founded on 9 September 1948. It has since been revised in 1995 and 1999. The nationality law of the Democratic People's Republic of Korea (DPRK) governs who is a citizen of the DPRK, and how one may gain or lose such citizenship. It prescribes citizenship qualifications, citizen rights, and citizen protections. While containing just 16 articles, it covers most of the basic features which can be found across modern citizenship legislation in other nations. Furthermore, North Korean nationality law incorporates anyone who resided in the country since the foundation of the DPRK. This includes varied groups due to the DPRK's annexation by Japan and the United States, occupation by the Soviet Union and final surrender to the Allies in 1945. The law assumes that people registered in North Korea became nationals of North Korea.

Types of citizenship

Source:

By blood
Jus sanguinis, or the "right of blood," means determining citizenship through the status of a child's parents. Any child born to two North Korean nationals becomes a North Korean citizen. However, if a child is born abroad to one North Korean national and one parent of a different nationality, the citizenship is to be determined by the parents.

Birthright
Jus soli, or the "right of the soil," is better known as birthright citizenship. This type of citizenship or nationality is awarded to citizens who are born within the jurisdiction of a given state. In North Korea, birth within the country's borders does not automatically grant a child citizenship, with the exception of a child born in North Korea with "unknown or stateless parents."

Naturalization
The process of naturalization involves formal proceedings for acquiring citizenship of a country. It is not guaranteed and can involve a wide variety of stipulations. In North Korea, the status of naturalization is unclear. It can only be granted by the Presidium of the Supreme People's Assembly, and further specific requirements are unknown.

Dual citizenship

The government of North Korea does not recognise dual nationality except if such a person defected to North Korea and travel is not possible. However, North Korean citizens who flee to South Korea automatically become South Korean citizens regardless of their own will as the North Korean government is not recognised by South Korean authorities based on the  Article 3 of the Constitution of South Korea which states that "Republic of Korea has the Korean peninsula and its dependent islands as its territory". They are not allowed to return to North Korea without special permission and approval from the South Korean government.

See also
Democratic People's Republic of Korea passport
Korean reunification
Nationality Law of the Democratic People's Republic of Korea
South Korean defectors

Notes

References

External links
Unofficial English and Japanese translations of the Nationality Law of 1963

1963 in law
North Korean nationality law